The following is the 2005 New Zealand Ice Hockey League season standings, results, leading scorers and awards.

2005 NZIHL standings

W = Main Round Win = 3 points
L = Main Round Loss
T = Main Round Tie = 2 points
BP = Bonus Point

2005 season results

Round 1 - Botany Downs
June 3, 2005 - West Auckland Admirals 5 v Canterbury Red Devils 2
June 4, 2005 - South Auckland Swarm 5 v Canterbury Red Devils 1
June 5, 2005 - South Auckland Swarm 4 v West Auckland Admirals 4

Round 2 - Queenstown
July 8, 2005 - Southern Stampede 6 v South Auckland Swarm 5
July 9, 2005 - Canterbury Red Devils 2 v South Auckland Swarm 3
July 10, 2005 - Southern Stampede 7 v Canterbury Red Devils 5

Round 3 - Avondale
August 5, 2005 - West Auckland Admirals 2 v Southern Stampede 2
August 6, 2005 - South Auckland Swarm 1 v Southern Stampede 4
August 7, 2005 - West Auckland Admirals 3 v South Auckland Swarm 3

Round 4 - Christchurch
August 19, 2005 - Canterbury Red Devils 5 v West Auckland Admirals 11
August 20, 2005 - Canterbury Red Devils 2 v Southern Stampede 7
August 21, 2005 - Southern Stampede 6 v West Auckland Admirals 6

Finals - Dunedin
September 16, 2005 - Southern Stampede 2 v West Auckland Admirals 1
September 17, 2005 - Southern Stampede 6 v West Auckland Admirals 3

2005 NZIHL Champion - Southern Stampede

2005 leading scorers

2005 NZIHL awards
MVP of Canterbury Red Devils - Troy Crittenden
MVP of South Auckland Swarm - Jon Duvale
MVP of Southern Stampede - Simon Glass
MVP of West Auckland Admirals - Jeff Bonazzo
Best Defenceman - BJ Laing - Southern Stampede
Top Goaltender - Zak Nothling - South Auckland Swarm
Top Points Scorer - Simon Glass - Southern Stampede
League MVP - Simon Glass - Southern Stampede
Finals MVP - Steven Reid - Southern Stampede

New Zealand Ice Hockey League seasons
New Zealand
Ice
New